Callicoon is a hamlet and census-designated place in the Town of Delaware, Sullivan County, New York, United States. The population was 206 at the 2020 census.

Callicoon is in the western part of the county in the Town of Delaware.

History

Callicoon got its name from Dutch hunters who settled the location in the 17th century. Because of the population of wild turkeys in the area, they named the community Kollikoonkill which translates into Wild Turkey Creek. In addition to animal abundance, the area was a source for lumber and a transport center with the Delaware River offering access to coastal cities to the south and east. In the 1840s, the Erie Railroad added to transportation by passing through along the banks of the Delaware River to link the Great Lakes with the East Coast. Because of the train station's vital central location, the community was renamed Callicoon Depot.

In 1888, a major fire destroyed much of Callicoon's business district. The town quickly rebuilt, but lost much of its architectural history prior to the late 19th century. The community's economy also became badly damaged when railroad travel gave way to the automobile. The last scheduled passenger train left Callicoon on November 27, 1966. By the late 1960s, tourism took over as the main industry as campgrounds and canoes drew a new generation of visitors. Campgrounds and canoe liveries, followed by bed and breakfast inns, drew a new generation of vacationers. The Villa Roma Resort and Conference Center also opened, increasing the number of vacationers to the area. Additionally, the Upper Delaware Scenic and Recreational River was created in 1978 to protect the land of the scenic valley, maintain quality of the Delaware River and enforce environmental sensitivity in the area.

Geography and location
Callicoon is located on the east bank of the Delaware River, adjacent to the Catskill Mountains in the southern portion of Upstate New York.

Callicoon is located at  (41.765831, -75.058682).

According to the United States Census Bureau, the CDP has a total area of 0.5 square mile (1.2 km2), of which, 0.4 square mile (1.0 km2)  is land and 0.1 square mile (0.2 km2)  (17.39%) is water.

Demographics

As of the census of 2000, there were 216 people, 94 households, and 61 families residing in the CDP. The population density was 565.1 per square mile (219.5/km2). There were 106 housing units at an average density of 277.3/sq mi (107.7/km2). The racial makeup of the CDP was 91.67% White, 4.63% Black or African American, 3.24% Asian, and 0.46% from two or more races. Hispanic or Latino of any race were 6.02% of the population.

There were 94 households, out of which 28.7% had children under the age of 18 living with them, 43.6% were married couples living together, 17.0% had a female householder with no husband present, and 35.1% were non-families. 28.7% of all households were made up of individuals, and 12.8% had someone living alone who was 65 years of age or older. The average household size was 2.30 and the average family size was 2.79.

In the CDP, the population was spread out, with 23.6% under the age of 18, 5.6% from 18 to 24, 25.0% from 25 to 44, 29.2% from 45 to 64, and 16.7% who were 65 years of age or older. The median age was 41 years. For every 100 females, there were 98.2 males. For every 100 females age 18 and over, there were 94.1 males.

The median income for a household in the CDP was $33,162, and the median income for a family was $33,068. Males had a median income of $32,917 versus $19,375 for females. The per capita income for the CDP was $14,217. About 15.1% of families and 16.8% of the population were below the poverty line, including 25.8% of those under the age of eighteen and 16.7% of those 65 or over.

Major highways
  New York State Route 17B (starts in Callicoon and ends in Monticello in the east)
  New York State Route 97 (runs from Hancock in the north to Port Jervis in the south, alongside the Delaware River)

Attractions and events
The Villa Roma Resort and Conference Center is a full resort hotel with tennis, cross-country skiing, lodging, and conference facilities. It is one of only a few resorts remaining in Sullivan County, a county once well known internationally for its massive resorts and entertainment venues.

Canoeing, rafting, camping, and hunting are major draws to the area. The Callicoon Canoe Regatta is held annually on a Sunday in early July. Dozens of competitors try their paddles on a journey navigating from the Callicoon Bridge to Skinner's Falls.

The Sullivan County Farmer's Market in Callicoon Creek Park on Sundays starting at 11:00 A.M. from Memorial day through November draws a big crowd as well. There is also a Holiday Market held in early December.

The Callicoon Business Association sponsors the Annual Tractor Parade, featuring more than 200 antique and modern tractors that travel down Main Street, in early June. The Callicoon Street Fair is held annually on the last Saturday of July, and once again, Main Street is closed down and turned over to a multitude of various vendors. The Street Fair features antiques, arts and crafts, homemade and hand-crafted items, food, and music.

Healthcare
Callicoon is home to the 25-bed Catskill Regional Medical Center, Grover M. Hermann Division, which serves the western portion of Sullivan County. A larger, more full-serviced hospital of the same name is located in Harris, between Monticello and Liberty.

Media
Sullivan County Democrat is a newspaper published bi-weekly covering news and events throughout the county. Its head office is located on Main Street in Callicoon.

Education
The Callicoon area was once home to Delaware Valley Central School. However, the school consolidated with schools in nearby Jeffersonville, New York and Narrowsburg, New York and closed. Narrowsburg's school also closed and Jeffersonville's school has become the sole elementary school for the region. A new junior-high/senior-high school building was built in centrally located Lake Huntington, New York. The recently formed Sullivan West Central School District still owns the school building in Callicoon, but has left it vacant.

Callicoon is the location of the Delaware Valley Job Corps Center, a job training facility located in the former Saint Joseph's Seraphic Seminary.

Delaware Free Library is a public library located on Main Street in the business district.

References

External links

 Callicoon information
 Sullivan County Democrat
 Delaware Valley Job Corps Center
 Villa Roma Resort and Conference Center

Census-designated places in New York (state)
Hamlets in New York (state)
Census-designated places in Sullivan County, New York
Hamlets in Sullivan County, New York
New York (state) populated places on the Delaware River